Celso Ramon Velázquez (July 29, 1897 – October 14, 1951) was a Paraguayan lawyer, educator and diplomat.

Career
1914: Secretary, ministry of justice, worship and education.
From 1915 to 1916 he was Secretary, Colegio Nacional de Asunción.
From 1916 to 1919 he was Under-secretary of finance.
From 1920 to 1924 he was Instructional judge, civil court.
From 1924 to 1927 he was Judge at a lower commercial court. 
From 1927 to 1931 he was Judge at the court of appeals. 
From 1933 to 1935, During Chaco war he was, member superior military tribunal, with rank of major. 
From 1942 to 1945 he was Professor, of civil and mercantile law, University de Asunción, dean of the law school, pres, of the university. 
In 1942 he was delegate to the 3d Conference of Foreign Ministers, Rio de Janeiro,
From July 1–22, 1944 he was delegate to the Bretton Woods Conference.
In 1945 he was Chairman, Paraguayan permanent delegation to the UNRRA. Inter-American Conference in Chapultepec.
From 25 April 1945 to 26 June 1945 he was delegate to the United Nations Conference on International Organization in San Francisco.
Starting in 1946 he was ambassador in Rio de Janeiro (Brazil).

References

1897 births
1951 deaths
Ambassadors of Paraguay to the United States
Ambassadors of Paraguay to Brazil